DISCOVERE 34, also known as CORONA 9027, was a United States optical reconnaissance satellite which was launched on 5 November 1961. It was the ninth of ten CORONA KH-2 satellites, based on the Agena B.

Launch 
The launch of DISCOVERER 34 occurred at 20:00:30 GMT on 5 November 1961. A Thor-Agena B launch vehicle was used, flying from Launch Complex 75-1-1 at the Vandenberg Air Force Base. Although the satellite achieved orbit, and was assigned the Harvard designation 1961 Alpha Epsilon 1, the launch was unsuccessful. An anomalous angle taken during ascent resulted in the spacecraft being placed into an unusable orbit. It was the second consecutive KH-2 launch failure; the previous mission, Discoverer 33, had failed to achieve orbit due to a separation failure.

Images were to have been recorded onto  film, and returned in a Satellite Recovery Vehicle (SRV). The Satellite Recovery Vehicle to be used by DISCOVERER 34 was SRV-553. Due to the launch failure, and a problem with a gas valve on the spacecraft, recovery of the SRV was not attempted. Discoverer 34 decayed from orbit on 7 December 1962.

References 

Spacecraft launched in 1961
Satellite launch failures
Spacecraft which reentered in 1962